Stewart Lerman is a Bronx born, New York-based, 2x Grammy winning music producer(3x nominated), recording engineer, who has worked with The Roches, Elvis Costello, Neko Case, Patti Smith, Antony and the Johnsons, Angelique Kidjo, Shawn Colvin, Julian Casablancas, Jules Shear, Marshall Crenshaw, Crash Test Dummies, Sharon Van Etten, Nellie McKay, Loudon Wainwright III, Black 47, David Johansen, David Byrne, Willie Nile, Charli XCX, Soulive, Darden Smith, Sophie B. Hawkins, Sufjan Stevens, St. Vincent, Regina Spektor, Mumford and Sons, Lucy Wainwright Roche, Vince Giordano, Liza Minnelli, Dar Williams, Carl Hancock Rux and 58 episodes of Boardwalk Empire, 10 episodes of HBO's Viny. 
He has also produced music for The Aviator, Revolutionary Road, Grey Gardens, The Royal Tenenbaums, The Life Aquatic, Mildred Pierce, Moonrise Kingdom, School of Rock, Bessie, The Knick, Begin Again among others, working with directors Martin Scorsese, Wes Anderson, Frank Oz, Barry Levinson, Todd Haynes, John Carney, Woody Allen.

References

Living people
People from the Bronx
American audio engineers
Record producers from New York (state)
Grammy Award winners
Place of birth missing (living people)
Engineers from New York City
Year of birth missing (living people)